Durand Bernarr is an American singer-songwriter and producer. He frequently provides background vocals for neo-soul artist Erykah Badu and featured vocals for other artists such as Anderson .Paak, Kaytranada, and The Internet. In 2019, Bernarr was a runner-up on the BET reality music competition The Next Big Thing. He released his latest album DUR& in 2020.

Early life 
Bernarr was born and raised in Cleveland, Ohio. He was raised an only child by his mother, a professional music teacher and vocal coach, and his father, an audio engineer who worked with artists like Jay-Z, Beyonce, Rihanna, Jill Scott, and Whitney Houston. At 16, Bernarr accompanied his father on tour for Earth, Wind & Fire as a production assistant. He attended church where his mother was the music director and his interest in music was further nurtured by the gospel music he heard there. He cites Erykah Badu, Rick James and Little Richard as his biggest influences.

Career 
In 2008, Bernarr began to grow his digital fanbase by posting YouTube videos that incorporated singing, dancing, and comedic commentary. He also covered popular songs by artists like Kanye West, Amy Winehouse, and Gnarls Barkley. In 2009, he released his first mixtape titled alcoholharmony: The MixT@pe consisting of studio versions of his popular covers from YouTube and original content via Bandcamp.

In 2010, Bernarr released his second EP 8ight: The Stepson of Erykah Badu, a compilation of Badu covers and medleys. Shortly after, Badu messaged him through Twitter and, having heard 8ight, she hired him as a background vocalist in her band Nedda Stella in 2011. He has toured with her regularly in the years since, as recently as 2020.

in November of 2012, he released his holiday EP titled "EXTRA Stankin' Christmas".
He's also independently released various EP's and LP's distribted between 2010 and 2014 on Spotify, apple music and Bandcamp. Some of which have been removed.
In September of 2016, he released a 7 track EP, "Sound Check" and released a video for the lead single "Around".

Bernarr collaborates with R&B and soul acts as a background or a featured vocalist. He has collaborated and performed with Ari Lennox, Kaytranada, The Foreign Exchange, The Internet, Sam Sparro, Thundercat, Knxwledge, Qveen Herby, and Teedra Moses.

Bernarr competed on BET's 2019 reality music competition series The Next Big Thing. He both rapped and sang, and eventually finished as one of the top three performers.

He released the album DUR& (pronounced Durand) in September 2020. In a review, Lucas Aubry of Numéro stated that the album "once again shows his incredible ability to go up in the highs like D’Angelo and down into the low and groovy frequencies of Nate Dogg in numerous rapped moments."

Personal life 
Bernarr resides in Los Angeles. He identifies as queer.

Discography

Studio albums 
 #Blameitonthemango (2014)
 DUR& (2020)
 Wanderlust (2022)

EPs 
 EXTRA Stankin' Christmas (2012)
 ANXIETY (2013)
 Sound Check (2016)

MIXTAPES 
 alcoholharmony: The MixT@pe (2009)
 8ight: The Stepson of Erykah Badu (2010)
 Some Time in December, 1987 (2011)
 80's Baby (2012)

as featured artist

References

External links 

1988 births
Living people
African-American male singer-songwriters
21st-century American pianists
Singer-songwriters from Ohio
LGBT African Americans
African-American pianists
Queer men
Queer songwriters
Queer singers
American LGBT songwriters
21st-century African-American male singers
21st-century American LGBT people